Goldanlu (also Romanized as Goldānlū) is a village in Baranduzchay-ye Jonubi Rural District, in the Central District of Urmia County, West Azerbaijan Province, Iran. At the 2006 census, its population was 181, in 59 families.

References 

Populated places in Urmia County